Chuck Soderberg (born May 24, 1957) was the Iowa State Representative from the 5th District.  He served in the Iowa House of Representatives from 2005 through 2015.  Soderberg was born in Burt, Iowa.  He has a B.A. in education from Westmar College.

, Soderberg serves on several committees in the Iowa House – Commerce and Environmental Protections committees.  He also serves as the chair of the Appropriations Committee.

Soderberg has been employed by the energy cooperative Northwest Iowa Power Cooperative for the past 24 years and is currently vice president of Planning and Legislative Services at NIPCO.

Biography
Soderberg was first elected to the House in 2004. Chuck is the Vice-President of Planning for Northwest Iowa Power Cooperative. He was born on May 24, 1957, in Algona, Iowa. His father, Gerald, and mother, Beryl, were dairy farmers. Chuck has one brother and three sisters.

Soderberg grew up near the town of Burt, Iowa. He graduated from the Burt Community School District in 1975. Following high school graduation, he attended one year at Iowa Lakes Community College then transferred to Westmar College in Le Mars. He graduated from Westmar in 1979.

Soderberg has two children, Leah, living in St. Paul, MN, and Andrew, living in Seattle, WA.

Soderberg and his wife, Dawn, attend the Calvin Christian Reform Church in Le Mars.

Prior to becoming elected to the House, Soderberg served on the Le Mars City Council from 1998–2004. He has served on several boards, including the Siouxland Interstate Metropolitan Planning Council, Le Mars Business Initiative Corporation, and the Le Mars Chamber of Commerce. In addition, he serves on the St. Luke’s Hospital Foundation Board where he helped raise money for the Children’s Miracle Network. He is a past little league coach, and fundraiser for the American Cancer Society, American Heart Association and Habitat for Humanity.

In 2008, Soderberg promoted a book, along with four of his House colleagues, which rejects the notion that human activity impacts global warming.

Electoral history
*incumbent

References

External links

 Representative Chuck Soderberg official Iowa General Assembly site
 
 Financial information (state office) at the National Institute for Money in State Politics
 Profile at Iowa House Republicans
  Northwest Iowa Power Cooperative (NIPCO)

1957 births
Living people
People from Kossuth County, Iowa
Republican Party members of the Iowa House of Representatives
People from Le Mars, Iowa